Jir Mahalleh-ye Kasma (also Romanized as Jīr Maḩalleh-ye Kasmā and Jīr Maḩalleh-ye Kasmā’; also known as Jīr Maḩalleh) is a village in Kasma Rural District, in the Central District of Sowme'eh Sara County, Gilan Province, Iran. At the 2006 census, its population was 435, in 128 families.

References 

Populated places in Sowme'eh Sara County